Tartu Ülikool 350 is a mountain peak in Central Pamir. It was first reached in 1982 to celebrate the 350th anniversary of the founding of the University of Tartu. It is located in the Tanimas mountain range in Tajikistan. At the time of first ascent it was considered to be the highest unreached peak in the territory of the former Soviet Union.

The summit has been reached by Estonian climbing groups twice, on 3 August 1982 (group: Kalev Muru, Kalle Hansen, Anu Kallavus, Andres Paris, Jaan Künnap and Kalle Aedviir), and on 31 July 2012 (group: Andres Hiiemäe, Erik Jaaniso, Marko Aasa, Priit Rooden, Merili Simmer, Kristjan-Erik Suurväli, Tõnu Põld, Priit Simson, Priit Joosu, Sven Oja).

At the time of the first conquest it was one out of five peaks in Soviet Union that was named after a university and the highest of them.

The peak is located at two weeks distance from the nearest inhabited area.

Among the things left on the top of the peak there are a plaque, a traditional university cap and the university flag.

Gallery 
Photos by Jaan Künnap from 1982 expedition:

References

External links 

 Remote Peaks Named after Tartu to Be Climbed Again ERR, 7/9/2012
 Images from the first ascent 1982 Tartu Ülikooli juubeliekspeditsioon / Firn
 "Pamiiri ekspeditsiooni materjalid" (Materials from Pamir expedition) Firn
 Enn Saar: Expedition report on the conquest of the peak in 1982 (in Russian)

Six-thousanders of the Pamir
Mountains of Tajikistan